Pselnophorus chihuahuaensis is a moth of the family Pterophoridae. It is found in North America, where it has been recorded from western Texas, Arizona and the intermediary desert regions of Mexico.

The ground color of the forewings is mixed white and buff. The hindwings are uniform pale light drab. Adults are on wing from late June to mid-August.

Etymology
The species name refers to the area in which the species has been collected thus far, which was historically part of the Mexican state of Chihuahua.

References

Oidaematophorini
Moths described in 2014